Arab Communist Party ( Al-Hizb Al-Shuyu'i Al-'Arabi) was a communist party in Syria, emerging as a pro-Chinese split from the Syrian Communist Party. The party was founded in February 1968. The party was harshly repressed during the 1970s, and many of its activists were imprisoned.  several of its cadres remained in Syrian jails.

References

1968 establishments in Syria
Banned communist parties
Communist parties in Syria
Defunct Maoist parties
Maoism in Asia
Political parties established in 1968
Secularism in Syria
Syrian opposition